

Schwarzburg

Countess of Schwarzburg (Incomplete), 1197–1552

Schwarzburg-Sondershausen

Countess of Schwarzburg-Sondershausen, 1552–1697

Princess of Schwarzburg-Sondershausen, 1697–1918

Schwarzburg-Rudolstadt

Countess of Schwarzburg-Rudolstadt, 1552–1711

Princess of Schwarzburg-Rudolstadt, 1711–1918

Titular Princess of Schwarzburg

House of Schwarzburg, 1918–1984

Notes

Sources

 
Schwarzburg
Schwarzburg